Szabolcs Kemenes (born 18 May 1986, in Budapest) is a retired Hungarian football player and currently the manager of III. Kerületi TVE.

Career
In 2003, he was the first choice goalkeeper of the Hungarian National U17 squad at the European U17 championship in Portugal.
In season 2006/07, he was the second choice goalkeeper for the Hungary U21 side after Zoltán Kovács. In season 2008/09, Kemenes was the key figure as Ermis Aradippou won the Cypriot Second Division and obtained the right to compete again in the First Division.

Coaching career
Kemenes retired at the end of the 2018–19 season and was appointed as manager of III. Kerületi TVE in June 2019.

Club statistics

Updated to games played as of 6 December 2014.

References

External links
 
 Charlton Athletic website
 uefa
 HLSZ
 

1986 births
Living people
Footballers from Budapest
Hungarian footballers
Hungary under-21 international footballers
Association football goalkeepers
Charlton Athletic F.C. players
Ferencvárosi TC footballers
Ethnikos Achna FC players
Ermis Aradippou FC players
MTK Budapest FC players
Budapest Honvéd FC players
Nemzeti Bajnokság I players
Cypriot First Division players
Cypriot Second Division players
Hungarian expatriate footballers
Expatriate footballers in England
Expatriate footballers in Cyprus
Hungarian expatriate sportspeople in England
Hungarian expatriate sportspeople in Cyprus